Brundidge Municipal Airport  was a city-owned, public-use airport located one nautical mile (1.85 km) northeast of the central business district of the Brundidge, a city in Pike County, Alabama, United States. It is currently closed indefinitely.

Facilities and aircraft 
It has one runway designated 5/23 with an asphalt surface measuring 3,000 by 80 feet (914 x 24 m).

For the 12-month period ending October 13, 1999, the airport had 2,627 general aviation aircraft operations, an average of 218 per month.

References

External links 
 Aerial image as of January 1992 from USGS The National Map
 
 Aeronautical chart at SkyVector

Defunct airports in Alabama
Airports in Alabama
Transportation buildings and structures in Pike County, Alabama